New Haven Adult School is an adult education program in Union City, California. As part of the New Haven Unified School District, the school serves approximately 2,500 community members annually.

History
New Haven Adult School was established in 1967 as Logan Adult School, a program of James Logan High School.

Campus
In September 2000, the school moved into the newly remodeled former Decoto School building.

Curriculum
New Haven Adult School offers courses for a broad range of the local community:
High school diploma completion and GED preparation courses;
English language-learning courses and a citizenship class;
Certificate programs for health care, office, and service occupations;
Community courses in computer use, health and fitness, and job preparation;
Various classes for adults over age 55;
Driver's education and traffic school; and
Even Start, a broadly-targeted program for qualifying families with children under age 7.

References

External links
New Haven Adult School

Adult education in the United States
Educational institutions established in 1967
High schools in Alameda County, California
Public high schools in California
1967 establishments in California